Dylan Williams may refer to:

 Dylan Williams (Australian footballer) (born 2001), Australian footballer
 Dylan Williams (footballer, born 1997), English footballer
 Dylan Williams (footballer, born 2003), English footballer